Chopper is a horror comic book miniseries written by Martin Shapiro, illustrated by Juan Ferreyra (who was later replaced by Cliff Richards from issue #3 onward), and published by Asylum Press in 2011.

The series is a modern-day reimagining of the Headless Horseman from Washington Irving's 1820 short story "The Legend of Sleepy Hollow" that takes place in Daytona Beach, Florida during Bike Week.

Plot
In the story, a police officer's rebellious teenage daughter takes a strange new ecstasy-like drug at a party that causes her to see ghosts – and one of them is a headless Hell's Angel on a motorcycle who collects the souls of sinners in the afterlife and he wants her tainted soul.

Adaptations

Web series
As part of an ambitious transmedia launch strategy, a prequel to the main Chopper storyline was produced as a web TV series starring actors Tyler Mane (Halloween, X-Men) and Andrew Bryniarski (The Texas Chainsaw Massacre, Batman Returns).

Films
A film adaptation of the comic book is in the works. The screenplay was written by Martin Shapiro.

References

External links 
Chopper section at Asylum Press website
Martin Shapiro's website
Interview with Martin Shapiro about Chopper
Juan Ferreyra's blog

Works based on The Legend of Sleepy Hollow